|}

This is a list of electoral district results of the 1980 Western Australian election.

Results by Electoral district

Albany

Ascot

Avon

Balcatta

Bunbury

Canning

Clontarf

Cockburn

Collie

Cottesloe

Dale

Darling Range

Dianella

East Melville

Floreat

Fremantle

Gascoyne

Geraldton

Gosnells

Greenough

Kalamunda

Kalgoorlie

Karrinyup

Katanning

Kimberley

Maylands

Melville

Merredin

Moore

Morley

Mount Hawthorn

Mount Lawley

Mount Marshall

Mundaring

Murchison-Eyre

Murdoch

Murray

Narrogin

Nedlands

Perth

Pilbara

Rockingham

Roe

Scarborough

South Perth

Stirling

Subiaco

Swan

Vasse

Victoria Park

Warren

Wellington

Welshpool

Whitford

Yilgarn-Dundas

See also 

 1980 Western Australian state election
 Members of the Western Australian Legislative Assembly, 1980–1983

References 

Results of Western Australian elections
1980 elections in Australia